The 2015–16 season was Fenerbahçe's 58th consecutive season in the Süper Lig and their 108th year in existence.

Season overview

 On 10 April 2015, Dirk Kuyt has signed to Feyenoord to play next year since his contract expired on 31 May 2015.
 On 11 June 2015, Fenerbahçe have released a statement on their official website confirming that Portuguese manager Vítor Pereira has been appointed manager on a two-year deal.
 On 17 June 2015, Centre back Simon Kjær signed a four-year contract with Fenerbahçe from Lille for a €7.65 million fee.
 On 22 June 2015, Mert Günok has signed a three-year contract with Bursaspor after his contract expired on 31 May 2015.
 On 23 June 2015, Fenerbahçe officially signed a four-year contract with Bursaspor former right back Şener Özbayraklı for ₺5.0 million.
 On 25 June 2015, Fenerbahçe have completed the signing of Atlético Paranaense striker Fernandão on a four-year deal the club revealed.
 On 27 June 2015, Fenerbahçe part ways with Emre Belözoğlu. The club said that the 34-year-old central midfielder is not in the team manager’s future plans thus his deal has not been renewed.
 On 2 July 2015, Fenerbahçe has taken on loan two players, Brazilian goalkeeper Fabiano and Senegalese centre-back Abdoulaye Ba, from the Portuguese club Porto for one season.
 On 3 July 2015, Fenerbahçe are in talks to sign winger Nani from Manchester United. The club announced the news on social media on Thursday night, saying on Twitter: "Fenerbahçe has begun talks with Nani and his club Manchester United to transfer the player. Nani will be in Istanbul on Sunday for a medical check up."
 On 3 July 2015, Fenerbahçe have completed the signing of São Paulo defensive midfielder Souza for an €8 million transfer fee the club revealed. On 4 July, have released a statement on their official website confirming that talks are underway with both São Paulo and their midfielder Josef de Souza. On 7 July 2015, Souza was named an official Fenerbahçe player.
 On 6 July 2015, Fenerbahçe have completed the signing of Manchester United winger Nani. Fenerbahçe have announced the signing of Nani from Manchester United for €6 million.
 On 8 July 2015, Nigerian striker Emmanuel Emenike has joined United Arab Emirates Pro League side Al-Ain on loan until the end of the season.
 On 9 July 2015, Fenerbahçe has begun to transfer talks with Robin van Persie and his club Manchester United.
 On 12 July 2015, Manchester United striker Robin van Persie has arrived in Istanbul’s Sabiha Gökçen Airport on Sunday at 8:00pm local time with his family in a private plane to complete his move to Fenerbahçe. On 13 July van Persie underwent health screening in Istanbul.
 On 14 July 2015, Robin van Persie has completed his move from Manchester United to Fenerbahçe for an undisclosed fee. The Netherlands striker, 31, was unveiled in front of about 10,000 supporters inside the club's stadium. He said: "I promise you one thing - I will do everything in my power to help Fenerbahce win as many trophies to make you happy. Let's do it together."
 On 17 July 2015, Fenerbahçe is to face Ukraine's Shakhtar Donetsk in the Champions League third qualifying round following a draw at UEFA headquarters in Nyon, Switzerland, on Friday. The Ukrainian side will travel to İstanbul in the first leg to face Fenerbahçe, which returns to UEFA competitions after two years.
 On 5 August 2015, Fenerbahçe was sent crashing out of the UEFA Champions League by Shakhtar Donetsk after lose with 3–0 in Arena Lviv.
 On 7 August 2015, Fenerbahçe, drawn against Atromitos of Greece in the UEFA Europa League play-off round.
 On 13 August 2015, Fenerbahçe officially signed a five-year contract with Ozan Tufan by €7.0M.
 On 14 August 2015, Fenerbahçe officially signed a three-year contract with Volkan Şen by €1.0M.

Kits 

Supplier: Adidas
Main sponsor: Yandex
Main sponsor (Europe): Turkish Airlines

Back sponsor: Halley
Sleeve sponsor: Coca-Cola

Short sponsor: Integral Forex
Socks sponsor: –

Kit information 
Adidas and Fenerbahçe extended their kit deal in February 2014 at least until 2018–19, while it is reported that the Adidas Fenerbahçe is worth $8.5M  season. Adidas produces the new Fenerbahçe 2015–16 Kits which feature no shirt sponsor as of now. The new Fenerbahçe 15–16 Away and Third Kits were released on 7 July 2015.

Transfers

In

Out

Total spending:  €42,780,000

Total income:  €20,500,000

Expenditure:  €22,280,000

Squad

First team squad

As of 26 May 2016

Squad statistics

Statistics

Goals

Assists

Club hierarchy

Board of directors

Management

Overall

Pre-season friendlies

Süper Lig

League table

Results summary

Results by round

Matches

Turkish Cup

Group stage

Round of 16

Quarter-finals

Notes

Semi-finals

Final

UEFA Champions League

Third qualifying round

Notes

UEFA Europa League

Play-off round

Group stage

Round of 32

Round of 16

See also
 2015–16 Süper Lig
 2015–16 Türkiye Kupası
 2015–16 UEFA Champions League
 2015–16 UEFA Europa League

Notes

References

Fenerbahçe S.K. (football) seasons
Fenerbahce
Fenerbahce